Hemant Laxman Gokhale is a former judge of the Supreme Court of India. 
He was a chief justice of Madras High Court before being appointed to the Supreme Court of India as a Judge in 2009.
He also served as Chief Justice of Allahabad High Court.

References

1949 births
Living people
Justices of the Supreme Court of India
People from Vadodara
University of Mumbai alumni
Chief Justices of the Madras High Court
Chief Justices of the Allahabad High Court
20th-century Indian judges
21st-century Indian judges